Elassoptes is a genus of true weevils in the beetle family Curculionidae. It is monotypic, containing the single species Elassoptes marinus.

References

Further reading

 
 
 

Cossoninae
Articles created by Qbugbot
Taxa described in 1873